"No Drama" is a song by American singer Becky G and Puerto Rican singer Ozuna. It was released by Kemosabe Records, RCA Records and Sony Music Latin on October 29, 2020.

Music video
The music video was released alongside the song on October 29. The music video was directed by Mike Ho.

Remix
On March 18, 2021, a cumbia version of the song without Ozuna was released.

Charts

Year-end charts

References

2020 songs
2020 singles
Becky G songs
Spanish-language songs
Songs written by Becky G
Ozuna (singer) songs
Songs written by Ozuna (singer)
Songs written by Elena Rose
Songs written by Edgar Semper
Songs written by Xavier Semper
Songs written by Elof Loelv
Song recordings produced by Elof Loelv
Song recordings produced by Ben Rice (producer)
Songs written by Ben Rice (producer)